The 1992 African Women's Handball Championship was the tenth edition of the African Women's Handball Championship, held in Ivory Coast from 11 to 24 November 1992. It acted as the African qualifying tournament for the 1993 World Women's Handball Championship.

Preliminary round
All times are local (UTC±0).

Group A

Group B

Group C

Main round

Group I

Group II

Placement games

Seventh place game

Fifth place game

Third place game

Final

Final ranking

External links
Results on todor66.com

1992 Women
African Women's Handball Championship
African Women's Handball Championship
1992 in African handball
Women's handball in Ivory Coast
November 1992 sports events in Africa
1992 in African women's sport